Neall is a surname. Notable people with the surname include:

Charles F. O'Neall (1875–1929), American real estate agent and politician
Gail Neall (born 1955), Australian swimmer
John H. O'Neall (1838–1907), U.S. Representative from Indiana
Robert R. Neall (born 1948), American politician

See also
Neall Ellis, Rhodesian/South African pilot
Neall Massif, mountain massif rising between the Salamander and West Quartzite Ranges

de:Neall
nl:Neall